The men's 800 metres event at the 1997 European Athletics U23 Championships was held in Turku, Finland, on 11, 12, and 13 July 1997.

Medalists

Results

Final
13 July

Semifinals
12 July
Qualified: first 4 in each to the Final

Semifinal 1

Semifinal 2

Heats
11 July
Qualified: first 4 in each heat and 4 best to the Semifinal

Heat 1

Heat 2

Heat 3

Participation
According to an unofficial count, 23 athletes from 18 countries participated in the event.

 (1)
 (1)
 (1)
 (1)
 (2)
 (1)
 (2)
 (1)
 (1)
 (1)
 (1)
 (1)
 (1)
 (2)
 (1)
 (2)
 (2)
 (1)

References

800 metres
800 metres at the European Athletics U23 Championships